The  is a professional wrestling championship in the Japanese promotion DDT Pro-Wrestling. Announced on December 28, 2019, at the D-Oh Grand Prix 2020 final event, the DDT Universal Championship was created as part of DDT's plans to expand internationally and reach a larger audience. , there have been nine reigns shared between six different wrestlers. Naruki Doi is the current champion in his second reign.

Title history
On January 7, it was announced that the inaugural match would pit Konosuke Takeshita against Chris Brookes. Brookes won the title at Into The Fight 2020, on February 23, 2020. As he was making his victory speech, Brookes was ambushed by Daisuke Sasaki who challenged him for the title before stealing the belt. Sasaki went on to defeat Brookes for the title at Judgement 2020: DDT 23rd Anniversary, on March 20. Brookes captured the title back in the main event of DDT TV Show! #8, on June 27. He successfully defended it against his fellow Englishman Drew Parker on September 7, at Get Alive 2020 and then against Naomi Yoshimura on October 10, at DDT TV Show! #9. Yuki Ueno captured the title on November 3 at Ultimate Party 2020. He then successfully defended it against Mao on November 8, at DDT TV Show! #11.

Reigns

Combined reigns

See also
Professional wrestling in Japan

References

External links
DDT Universal Championship

DDT Pro-Wrestling championships
Openweight wrestling championships